Mandegan (also Romanized as Māndegān; also known as Māndegān-e Soflá and Namdagūn) is a village in Padena-ye Sofla Rural District, Padena District, Semirom County, Isfahan Province, Iran. At the 2006 census, its population was 894, in 201 families.

References 

Populated places in Semirom County